South Bend Airport is a commuter train station on, and the eastern terminus of, the South Shore Line. In November 1992, the Airport station replaced the South Shore Line's former terminus at the South Bend Amtrak Station. The new station was constructed at a cost of $1.8 million and dedicated on November 20, 1992.

The station has a waiting room. Because the station is incorporated into the South Bend International Airport building, riders can also take advantage of its extensive lounging areas, shops and a meditation room.

Until November 27, 2009, most eastbound weekend South Shore Line trains terminated at this station. Since then, those trips have been cut in half, creating much larger gaps in service, to improve on-time performance for South Shore trains, which had suffered because the section of the line between Michigan City and South Bend is almost entirely single-tracked. Thus, if the westbound train got delayed, the eastbound train would get delayed even more because it will need to wait for the westbound train to clear the track.

History
Plans to move the South Shore Line station to the airport, creating an air, bus, and rail intermodal terminal, had dated back to the mid-1970s by the airport authority. In fact, plans to move the South Shore Line station there began to be formulated very shortly after the South Shore Line moved away from its stop in the city's downtown, which required street running, and into a newly constructed station.

There was talk in the 1980s, for the South Shore Line to stop at the Union Station in downtown South Bend, either instead of or in addition to stopping at the airport.

By 1989, the area surrounding the location of the South Bend's South Shore Line station that had been opened in the 1970s had come to be seen as an unsafe and isolated part of town. At this point, discussions had been ongoing about relocating the station to the station to the airport for over a decade, but had been stalled by disagreement over the route that the train should take to get to the airport. In 1989 the Venango River Corp., the parent company of the Chicago South Shore and South Bend, went bankrupt, and NICTD became the owner and operator of the South Shore Line. Venango's owner was said to have supported moving the station to the airport, but was also said to have championed having it take a route that would run through the Ardmore neighborhood of South Bend, approaching the airport from its west. In 1989, NICTD recommended moving the station to the airport, to provide what they believed would be a safer station at a more appealing location and with a large amount of available parking.

There was hope that moving the station to the airport would position passenger air service at the airport as an alternative for northwest Indiana residents (an area also served by the South Shore Line) to Chicago's airports Midway and O'Hare.

The station was built at the end of what started out as Chicago South Shore and South Bend Railroad's freight spur. The physical location of the station was chosen due to the existence of the freight spur, but this alignment was originally intended to be only temporary. The opening of a new station at the airport came on November 20, 1992. Approximately 200 people attended the opening ceremony. The new station cost $1.8 million, with NICTD paying approximately $1 million of the cost, and the rest being paid by the airport authority. The station was originally an open platform, but, as was planned from its initial construction, was later covered soon after with the construction of a new passenger terminal addition connected to the station. From its opening, the station has been accessible to those with disabilities.

At the time of the opening, sources for NICTD claimed that the station made the airport only the second airport in the United States to be served by a commuter railroad.

Connections

Bus
Transpo
 Route 4: Lincoln Way West/Airport

Coach USA
 Tri State/United Limo routes

Proposed replacement

There is a possibility that the station may be relocated or replaced. The current route that carries the South Shore Line to its existing station is considered slow and circuitous. The top contending locations for a new location are the west side of the airport and the city's downtown.

References

External links
 
 South Shore Line - Stations
 South Bend Regional Airport

South Shore Line stations in Indiana
Airport railway stations in the United States
Transportation in South Bend, Indiana
Buildings and structures in South Bend, Indiana
Railway stations in St. Joseph County, Indiana
Railway stations in the United States opened in 1992